Birds described in 1895 include  alder flycatcher, banded whiteface, black-capped catbird, Cocos flycatcher, frill-necked monarch, dark-eared myza, Gillett's lark, Grey-headed honeyeater, trilling tailorbird

Events 
Manchester Museum acquires the bird skin collection of Henry Eeles Dresser it includes Palaearctic bird species, bee-eaters and rollers that formed the basis of Dresser's books'
Death of Henry Seebohm, Janos Frivaldszky,

Publications
Oskar Engelhard von Löwis of Menar Unsere Baltischen Singvögel  Reval, Franz Kluge, 1895
Frederick Webb Headley The Structure and Life of Birds, London and New York, Macmillan and Co. (1895)
D'Arcy Wentworth Thompson, 1895. A glossary of Greek birds. Oxford U. P.
Alexandre Noël Charles Acloque 1895–1900. Faune de France, contenant la description des espèces indigènes. Paris online (pars)
Ernst Hartert On some Birds from the Congo Region.Novitates Zoologicae ii. p. 55.
Ongoing events
Osbert Salvin and Frederick DuCane Godman 1879–1904. Biologia Centrali-Americana . Aves
Richard Bowdler Sharpe Catalogue of the Birds in the British Museum London,1874-98.
Eugene W. Oates and William Thomas Blanford 1889–1898. The Fauna of British India, Including Ceylon and Burma. Vols. I-IV. Birds.
Anton Reichenow, Jean Cabanis,  and other members of the German Ornithologists' Society in Journal für Ornithologie online BHL
The Ibis
Ornithologische Monatsberichte Verlag von R. Friedländer & Sohn, Berlin.1893–1938 online Zobodat
Ornis; internationale Zeitschrift für die gesammte Ornithologie.Vienna 1885-1905online BHL
The Auk online BHL

References

Bird
Birding and ornithology by year